Oleksandr Oleksandrovych Zholobetskyi (was born April 24, 1966, in Mykolaiv) — a Ukrainian social-politic leader and statesman, an entrepreneur, People's Deputy of Ukraine of the VIIIth convocation.

Bibliography 
He was born into a family of shipbuilders: his father worked 3 years at the Black Sea shipbuilding plant, his mother is a worker. In 1983 he graduated from Secondary School No. 52 with honour, in 1988 — Murmansk High Marine School on specialty «ship engineer-electromechanician». In 1988—1991 he worked as a ship electromechanician at oversees ships Joint-stock company  «Dalmoreproduct». Since 1991, having returned to Mykolaiv, is engaged in entrepreneurship (built the first private Petrol Retail Station in the city). In 2007 he graduated from Odessa Regionis Institutum Public Administration National Academiae Public Administration sub Praeses Ucraina with qualification «Master of State Administration».

Political career 
In 2002—2004 he headed Mykolaiv City organization of Ukraine's party of manufacturers and entrepreneurs, protected against falsifications during the Presidential Elections. In 2002 —2010 – a deputy of Mykolaiv City Council of the IV—VIth convocations. Since 27.11.2014 he is a deputy of Ukraine of the VIIIth convocation.
 Elected in:	Election district #129 
 Region:	Mykolaiv Oblast 
 Faction:	Member of the deputy faction of Party Petro Poroshenko Bloc "Solidarity"
 Post:	Chairperson of the subcommittee on insurance activities of the Verkhovna Rada of Ukraine Committee on Financial Policy and Banking

Social activity 
In the frames of deputy's activity he is famous as an initiator of the parkland “Pobeda”, Vavarovskyi stadium and City Embankment return to the city's property, the cancel of Mykolaiv's Portland selling to enterprise «Nika-Tera». An honoured president of «St.Antoniy» Fund. Since November, 2013 he is a participant of the Maidan activities in Kyiv.

Family 
Wife  — Olena Mykolaivna Zholobetskaya. Sons – Borys, Olexandr.

Awards 
A Certificate of Appreciation of Ministry of Labour and social policy of Ukraine (2005)

References

External links 

1966 births
Living people
Ukrainian businesspeople
Eighth convocation members of the Verkhovna Rada
21st-century Ukrainian politicians
Politicians from Mykolaiv